Clément Champoussin (born 29 May 1998) is a French cyclist, who currently rides for UCI WorldTeam . In October 2020, he was named in the startlist for the 2020 Vuelta a España. On stage 20 of the 2021 Vuelta he won the final mountain stage finding himself among the GC contenders of Roglič, Haig and Mas. He finished the race 16th overall.

Major results

2018
 2nd Ruota d'Oro
 3rd Piccolo Giro di Lombardia
 5th Overall Tour de l'Avenir
 7th Overall Kreiz Breizh Elites
 9th Overall Ronde de l'Isard
2019
 1st  Overall Giro del Friuli-Venezia Giulia
1st  Points classification
1st Stages 1 (TTT) & 4
 2nd Piccolo Giro di Lombardia
 3rd Overall Ronde de l'Isard
 3rd Overall Grand Prix Priessnitz spa
 4th Overall Tour de l'Avenir
 6th Overall Orlen Nations Grand Prix
1st Stage 1 (TTT)
 9th Overall Giro di Sicilia
 9th Gran Piemonte
2020
 8th Overall Tour de Luxembourg
2021
 1st Stage 20 Vuelta a España
 2nd Faun-Ardèche Classic
 4th Trofeo Laigueglia
 6th Overall Tour de l'Ain
2022
 6th Faun-Ardèche Classic
 7th Classic Grand Besançon Doubs
 9th GP Miguel Induráin
 10th Trofeo Laigueglia
 10th Tour du Jura
2023
 5th Trofeo Laigueglia

Grand Tour general classification results timeline

References

External links

1998 births
Living people
French male cyclists
French Vuelta a España stage winners
Cyclists from Nice
20th-century French people
21st-century French people